"Music Makes Me High" is the fourth single released from the Lost Boyz' debut album, Legal Drug Money. The original version of the song was produced by Mr. Sex and Charles Suitt, the song's official remix was produced by L.T. Hutton and featured Tha Dogg Pound and a then unknown Canibus in his first official appearance. The remix had a music video released which showed the Lost Boyz, Tha Dogg Pound and Canibus at a pool party.

The song was the second most successful single of the five released from Legal Drug Money, after "Renee". It peaked at number 51 on the Billboard Hot 100 and number five on the Billboard Hot Rap Singles.

Single track listing

Chart history

Peak positions

Year-End charts

References

1996 singles
Lost Boyz songs
1995 songs
Uptown Records singles
Universal Records singles
Songs written by Mr. Cheeks